The 1944 National Division was the 7th edition of the Turkish National Division. Beşiktaş won their second title.

Participants
Fenerbahçe - Istanbul Football League, 1st
Beşiktaş - Istanbul Football League, 2nd
Vefa - Istanbul Football League, 4th
İstanbulspor - Istanbul Football League, 5th
Harp Okulu - Ankara Football League, 1st
AS-FA Ankaragücü - Ankara Football League, 2nd
UDV Göztepe - İzmir Football League, 1st
Karşıyaka - İzmir Football League, 2nd

League standings

Results

See also
 1944 Prime Minister's Cup
 1944 Turkish Football Championship

References

Sources
 Erdoğan Arıpınar; Tevfik Ünsi Artun, Cem Atabeyoğlu, Nurhan Aydın, Ergun Hiçyılmaz, Haluk San, Orhan Vedat Sevinçli, Vala Somalı (June 1992). Türk Futbol Tarihi (1904-1991) vol.1, Page(83-84), Türkiye Futbol Federasyonu Yayınları.

External links
 RSSSF

Turkish National Division Championship seasons
1943–44 in Turkish football
Turkey